The following highways are numbered 119:

Argentina
 National Route 119

Canada
 New Brunswick Route 119
 Ontario Highway 119 (former)
 Prince Edward Island Route 119

Costa Rica
 National Route 119

India
 National Highway 119 (India)

Japan
 Japan National Route 119

Philippines
 National Route 119 (Philippines)

United States
 U.S. Route 119
 Alabama State Route 119
 Arkansas Highway 119
 California State Route 119
 Colorado State Highway 119
 Florida State Road 119 (former)
 County Road 119 (Duval County, Florida)
 Georgia State Route 119
 Illinois Route 119
 Indiana State Road 119
 K-119 (Kansas highway)
 Louisiana Highway 119
 Maine State Route 119
 Maryland Route 119
 Massachusetts Route 119
 M-119 (Michigan highway)
 Minnesota State Highway 119
 Missouri Route 119
 Nevada State Route 119
 New Hampshire Route 119
 County Route 119 (Bergen County, New Jersey)
 New Mexico State Road 119
 New York State Route 119
 County Route 119 (Cortland County, New York)
 County Route 119 (Erie County, New York)
 County Route 119 (Monroe County, New York)
 County Route 119 (Montgomery County, New York)
 County Route 119 (Schenectady County, New York)
 County Route 119 (Seneca County, New York)
 County Route 119 (Steuben County, New York)
 County Route 119 (Tompkins County, New York)
 North Carolina Highway 119
 Ohio State Route 119
 South Carolina Highway 119
 Tennessee State Route 119
 Texas State Highway 119
 Texas State Highway Spur 119
 Farm to Market Road 119
 Utah State Route 119
 Vermont Route 119
 Virginia State Route 119
 Virginia State Route 119 (1924-1926) (former)
 Virginia State Route 119 (1926-1928) (former)
 Virginia State Route 119 (1928-1933) (former)
 Virginia State Route 119 (1933-1964) (former)
 Washington State Route 119
 Wisconsin Highway 119

Territories
 Puerto Rico Highway 119